This is a list of museums located in Belgium.

Alken

Antwerp
DIVA Museum for Diamonds, Jewellery and Silver
EcoHuis
Etnographic Museum
Fotomuseum
Royal Museum of Fine Arts (KMSKA)
Museum of Modern Art Antwerp (MuHKA)
Plantin-Moretus Museum
Museum aan de Stroom (MAS; Museum at the current)
Volkskundemuseum
National Maritime Museum
Maagdenhuismuseum (Virgin House Museum)
Middelheim Museum
ModeMuseum (Fashion Museum)
Rubenshuis (Rubens House)
Rockox House
Mayer van den Bergh Museum
Museum Vleeshuis

Beveren
Organ collection Ghysels, Kallo

Boussu
Grand Hornu, Hornu

Bruges
Groeningemuseum

Brussels

Belgian Centre for Comic Strip Art
BELvue Museum
Horta Museum
Magritte Museum
Musical Instrument Museum
Royal Museum of the Armed Forces and of Military History
Royal Museums of Art and History
Royal Museums of Fine Arts of Belgium
Royal Belgian Institute of Natural Sciences

Deinze
Museum van Deinze en de Leiestreek

Dendermonde
Jazz Center Flanders

Engis
Gourmet Library and museum, Hermalle-sous-Huy

Ghent
Museum of Fine Arts
Stedelijk Museum voor Actuele Kunst (SMAK)
Design museum Gent

Grimbergen
Museum for Old Techniques (MOT)

Halle
South-West Brabant Museum

Harelbeke
Peter Benoit Huis

Kampenhout
Brabant Center for Music Traditions

Koksijde
Paul Delvaux Museum

Kruishoutem
SONS Museum

Leuven
M - Museum Leuven, Leuven

Liège
Curtius Museum, Liège

Lier
Stedelijk Museum Wuyts-Van Campen en Baron Caroly, Lier

Louvain-la-Neuve
 Musée Hergé

Mechelen
Jewish Museum of Deportation and Resistance
Technopolis
Toy Museum

Mons
Museum François Duesberg
Beaux-Arts Mons
Maison Van Gogh

Peer
 Armand Preud'homme Museum (1990-2018)

Tellin
Bell and Carillon Museum (1992–2013)

Tervuren
Royal Museum for Central Africa

Tournai
Musée des Beaux-Arts

Willebroek
 Harmonium Art museuM

Ypres
In Flanders Fields Museum

References

Belgium
Museums
Museums
Museums
Belgium